is a Japanese former professional boxer who has competed from 1989 to 1996. He was the first Japanese boxer to capture a middleweight title having held the WBA title from 1995 to 1996.

Takehara turned pro in 1989 and had a relatively short professional career, spanning only seven years. In 1995, he landed a shot at the WBA Middleweight title
against Jorge Fernando Castro and won by decision. Takehara lost the belt in his only defeat during his first defense to William Joppy in a 9th-round TKO. He was overwhelmed in the first round and appeared unable to determine incoming attacks. Ringside doctors examination discovered Takehara had posterior vitreous detachment which progressed into retinal detachment and subsequently forced him into retirement.

Childhood and early career 
Takehara got into numerous street fights during his teens. He briefly played baseball before joining the school judo team. Takehara did not move on to high school, after graduating middle school, he moved to Tokyo in 1988 to start a boxing career. He took numerous part-time jobs while training, including working as a cleaning man at Yokohama Arena, where he would later make his first (and only) title defense of the WBA Middleweight Title.

Professional career 
Takehara made his debut on May 15, 1989, with a 4th-round KO victory. He went on to win the Japanese Middleweight Title in 1991, defending it three times. He won the vacant OPBF Middleweight Title in 1993, which he defended six times.

Takehara got a shot against WBA Middleweight Champion Jorge Castro, who had a record of 98-4-2 at the time and had made five title defenses. Takehara went into the fight as a huge underdog, and the match took place in the tiny Korakuen Hall despite being a world title bout. Regardless, Takehara knocked Castro down in the 3rd round, and won by unanimous decision in 12 rounds, becoming the first ever Japanese boxer to win a world middleweight title.

The win against Castro generated huge media hype, and Takehara's title defense took place in Yokohama Arena on June 24, 1996, against William Joppy. Though both fighters were undefeated, Takehara was once again the underdog, and Joppy announced that he would win easily by KO. The fight was a disaster for Takehara, who was knocked down in the 1st, and lost by TKO in the 9th when the referee stopped the fight, giving up the middleweight title in half a year. Takehara himself admitted that he would have been knocked out even if the referee did not stop the fight, and Joppy remarked that he could have knocked out Takehara much earlier if he had wanted.

While preparing for his next fight, Takehara was diagnosed with a detached retina. This forced him to retire from boxing at only 24 years of age. His record was 24-1-0 (18KOs).

Legacy 
Winning a world middleweight title had been regarded as impossible for any Japanese boxer, since the division had featured some of the sports best champions, including Sugar Ray Leonard, Roberto Durán, Marvin Hagler, and Thomas Hearns. Though Takehara lost in his first defense, William Joppy remained a top middleweight contender for more than seven years after beating Takehara. Joppy remarked before his fight against Félix Trinidad that Takehara punched the hardest of any of the fighters he had faced. Takehara is now known more for his success after retiring from boxing, but his short career has left an important legacy on Japanese boxing.

Post retirement 
Few people knew Takehara as a former world champion, and he had to rely on part-time jobs to maintain a living. After years of mediocre living, Takehara achieved immense popularity in 2000 after appearing on the variety show "Gachinko Fight Club." The show is similar to The Contender in concept, where the lives of aspiring boxers are documented as they go through hard training and life struggles. The show produced 12 professional boxers during its three-year run, and Takehara's role as the tough but fair-minded trainer was central to the show's success, allowing Takehara to pursue further opportunities in the television business. Since then, he has appeared on numerous variety and talk shows, and has even guest-starred in a TV drama series and released a rap CD. Takehara's blog and column in the Yahoo! Japan web magazine enjoy great popularity. IN 2014 he was diagnosed with bladder cancer and underwent treatment that left him in remission since 2015.

Professional boxing record

{|class="wikitable" style="text-align:center; font-size:95%"
|-
!
!Result
!Record
!Opponent
!Type
!Round, time
!Date
!Location
!Notes
|- align=center
|25
|Loss||24–1||align=left| William Joppy
|TKO
|9 (12), 
|1996–06–24
|align=left|
|align=left|
|- align=center
|24
|Win||24–0||align=left| Jorge Castro
|UD
|12
|1995–12–19
|align=left|
|align=left|
|- align=center
|23
|Win||23–0||align=left| Lee Shung-Chun
|PTS
|12
|1995–09–12
|align=left|
|align=left|
|- align=center
|22
|Win||22–0||align=left| Park Young-Ki
|KO
|1 (12)
|1995–04–17
|align=left|
|align=left|
|- align=center
|21
|Win||21–0||align=left| Craig Trotter
|KO
|7 (12)
|1994–12–19
|align=left|
|align=left|
|- align=center
|20
|Win||20–0||align=left| Lee Hyun-Sik
|PTS
|12
|1994–09–18
|align=left|
|align=left|
|- align=center
|19
|Win||19–0||align=left| Alex Tui
|KO
|7 (12)
|1994–06–12
|align=left|
|align=left|
|- align=center
|18
|Win||18–0||align=left| Noli de Guia
|KO
|1, 
|1994–02–21
|align=left|
|align=left|
|- align=center
|17
|Win||17–0||align=left| Nico Toriri
|KO
|6 (12)
|1993–11–22
|align=left|
|align=left|
|- align=center
|16
|Win||16–0||align=left| Lee Sung-Chun
|KO
|12 (12), 
|1993–05–24
|align=left|
|align=left|
|- align=center
|15
|Win||15–0||align=left| Satoshi Yokozaki
|KO
|5 (10)
|1993–02–15
|align=left|
|align=left|
|- align=center
|14
|Win||14–0||align=left| Biney Martin
|UD
|10
|1992–08–17
|align=left|
|align=left|
|- align=center
|13
|Win||13–0||align=left| Yoshinori Nishizawa
|PTS
|10
|1992–05–17
|align=left|
|align=left|
|- align=center
|12
|Win||12–0||align=left| Hisashi Teraji
|KO
|2 (10), 
|1992–02–17
|align=left|
|align=left|
|- align=center
|11
|Win||11–0||align=left| Takehito Saijo
|KO
|7 (10)
|1991–10–28
|align=left|
|align=left|
|- align=center
|10
|Win||10–0||align=left| Jiro Kashiwara
|KO
|4
|1991–07–15
|align=left|
|align=left|
|- align=center
|9
|Win||9–0||align=left| Tomoo Suzuki
|KO
|1 
|1991–02–18
|align=left|
|align=left|
|- align=center
|8
|Win||8–0||align=left| Park Keon-Soo
|KO
|1 
|1990–11–26
|align=left|
|align=left|
|- align=center
|7
|Win||7–0||align=left| Satoshi Yokozaki
|KO
|10 (10)
|1990–07–30
|align=left|
|align=left|
|- align=center
|6
|Win||6–0||align=left| Haruhisa Tokuda
|KO
|2
|1990–02–18
|align=left|
|align=left|
|- align=center
|5
|Win||5–0||align=left| Biney Martin
|PTS
|6
|1989–12–23
|align=left|
|align=left|
|- align=center
|4
|Win||4–0||align=left| Yoshihiro Kitada
|KO
|1
|1989–11–10
|align=left|
|align=left|
|- align=center
|3
|Win||3–0||align=left| Kiyoshi Hirayama
|KO
|1
|1989–09–18
|align=left|
|align=left|
|- align=center
|2
|Win||2–0||align=left| Kiyoshi Hirayama
|KO
|2 
|1989–07–17
|align=left|
|align=left|
|- align=center
|1
|Win||1–0||align=left| Masao Tadano
|KO
|4
|1989–05–15
|align=left|
|align=left|

Filmography 
 Underdog (2020)
 Akira and Akira (2022)

See also 
 List of WBA world champions
 List of middleweight boxing champions
 List of Japanese boxing world champions
 Boxing in Japan

References

External links 
 

1972 births
Living people
Middleweight boxers
People from Hiroshima Prefecture
World middleweight boxing champions
Japanese male boxers